Juja is an electoral constituency in Kenya. It is one of twelve constituencies in Kiambu County, one of four in the former Thika District. The constituency was established for the 1969 elections.

Before the 2013 elections, the constituency was broken into Juja, Ruiru and Thika Town constituencies. The current MP is Hon. George Koimburi who won a by-election in 2021 following the death of Hon. Francis Munyua Waititu of Jubilee Party who had been first elected in 2013 and re-elected in 2017.

It is home to the main campus of Jomo Kenyatta University of Agriculture and Technology (JKUAT).

Members of Parliament

Locations and wards 
The electoral wards in this constituency are Juja, Kalimoni, Witeithie, Murera and Theta.

References

External links 
Juja Constituency

Constituencies in Kiambu County
Constituencies in Central Province (Kenya)
1969 establishments in Kenya
Constituencies established in 1969